César Augusto Sebba, also commonly known as César Sebba, is a former Brazilian basketball player. Seba participated at the 1967 FIBA World Championship with the Brazil national basketball team.

References

Year of birth missing (living people)
Living people
Brazilian men's basketball players
1967 FIBA World Championship players